Indian Creek Township may refer to:

Illinois
 Indian Creek Township, White County, Illinois

Indiana
 Indian Creek Township, Lawrence County, Indiana
 Indian Creek Township, Monroe County, Indiana
 Indian Creek Township, Pulaski County, Indiana

Iowa
 Indian Creek Township, Mills County, Iowa
 Indian Creek Township, Story County, Iowa

Kansas
 Indian Creek Township, Anderson County, Kansas

Missouri
 Indian Creek Township, Monroe County, Missouri

North Dakota
 Indian Creek Township, Hettinger County, North Dakota, in Hettinger County, North Dakota

Township name disambiguation pages